Circleville is a city in and the county seat of Pickaway County, Ohio, United States, set along the Scioto River, 25 miles (40 km) south of Columbus. The population was 13,927 at the 2020 census. The city is best-known today as the host of the Circleville Pumpkin Show, an annual festival held since 1903.

The city's name is derived from its original layout created in 1810 within the  diameter of a circle of a Hopewell tradition earthwork dating to the early centuries of the Common Era. The county courthouse was built in the center of the innermost circle. By the late 1830s, for numerous reasons residents decided to gain authorization from the state legislature to change the layout to a standard grid, which was accomplished by the mid-1850s. All traces of the Hopewell earthwork were destroyed in Circleville, although hundreds of other monuments may be found in the Ohio Valley.

History

Early history
By the mid-18th century, the Lenape (Delaware Indians) were pushed west from Pennsylvania by European settlers flowing into the colony. The Lenape were given permission by the Wyandot people to settle in the Ohio country. One of their settlements was Maguck, built by 1750 on the banks of the Scioto River. Modern Circleville was built to the north of this site.

The frontier explorer Christopher Gist was the first recorded European visitor to the Circleville area. Gist reached Maguck, the small Lenape village of about 10 families on the east bank of the Scioto River, on January 20, 1751. He wrote that he had stayed in the town for four days. Between the time of establishment of the United States and of the city's settlement, the land was owned by the US federal government, as opposed to other land in the county which was part of the Virginia Military District.

Family of George Hitler Sr. arrived in 1799, his descendants still live in the city. Dr. Gay Hitler used to be a dentist. Now there are here two Hitler roads, Hubert Hitler Road, Hitler Pond, Hitler-Park, Hitler-Ludvig cemetery. There is no connection between the family and Adolf Hitler, whose surname was defined much later.

Establishment

On January 12, 1810, Pickaway County was established by order of the Ohio General Assembly. On February 19 of that year, the assembly appointed David Bradford, George Jackson, and John Pollock to choose the location for the county seat. The men ventured into the county and inspected numerous sites. At the time, the Hopewell fortifications were still intact, and were selected for the site. An 1880 history of the county presumes that the men thought the site location would spur the preservation and maintenance of the Hopewell mounds. The group was then given a director on July 25 to oversee them, with Daniel Dreisbach appointed. Dreisbach was to purchase the land, determine lots, and distribute them. At the time, the land was owned by Jacob Zeiger, Zeiger Jr., and Samuel Watt; Dreisbach purchased 200 acres for $800 to $900.

Circleville was founded by European-American settlers during 1810, as people relocated westward after the American Revolutionary War.

The first sale of property in the new town was followed with a celebration: a barbecue, and the manufacture of a several-hundred-pound wheel of cheese, which was drawn to the barbecue on a sled. A competition for the honor of constructing the first house also took place. By 1827, the town had 725 people in 102 individual houses, a courthouse, jail, government office building, a private and public school, one church, nine stores, three pharmacies, three groceries, and a market house. All were built in brick, except the jail, built in stone.

The settlement was formally incorporated as the town of Circleville in 1814, and it was made a city on March 25, 1853.

Squaring the circle
Dissatisfaction among residents rose over Circleville's layout, however. Some believed the design was "childish sentimentalism", and others complained that the lots were too irregular and inconvenient, and that a circular plan wasted space that could become profitable. As well, the space around the central courthouse was unpresentable. People from the countryside would hitch their horses around the courthouse, which would draw hogs and domestic animals to the area and surrounding city.

In March 1837 at the request of the town, the Ohio General Assembly authorized the town to make the alterations, given the consent of all property owners in the circle. In March 1838, after no activity, the assembly authorized alterations to any quarter of the circle given consent from property owners in the quarter. The "Circleville Squaring Company" was created to convert the town plan into a squared grid, as was typical of other platted towns. Later that month, the southeast corner was the first to be altered, followed by the northwest quarter in September 1838. The northeast corner was only squared in 1849, and the final quarter, the southwest, was altered in 1856. The work involved destroying, moving, or constructing buildings, grading and repaving roads, and more. Due to these changes, no traces of the original earthworks remain, beside a section of elevated ground at the corner of Pickaway and Franklin streets.

The only drawings of Circleville before its squaring were made by G. F. Wittich. He made sketches of the courthouse, the circle, and other buildings in 1836, and used those and information from residents to create a map around 1860, which he made a watercolor of in 1870.

A history of the county makes note that the citizens of Circleville regret the rare circular layout of the town was ever changed.

20th century

During April 1967, Bingman's Drug Store and several neighboring buildings on West Main Street in downtown Circleville were destroyed when Lee Holbrook, the husband of a drug store employee, brought a wooden box containing bundled dynamite to the store and it detonated during a struggle with the store's staff. Holbrook and four store employees died in the blast and ensuing fire; nearly thirty others were injured. Holbrook's wife was not at the store and was not among the injured.

Starting in 1976, residents began receiving mysterious letters from an unknown source. The identity of the letter writer remains a mystery to this day.

On October 13, 1999, an F-3 tornado hit the city, set off by a squall line moving through the region. The tornado touched down on the north side of town, doing substantial damage to a barber's shop and a masonry building. A furniture store was also damaged with a hole in its roof, where it was reported that items from inside the store were sucked out. Damage to nearby buildings occurred as the tornado moved east across the north-central part of town. The tornado moved into a residential area in the Northwood Park neighborhood, destroying several homes and damaging trees and vehicles.

Geography
Circleville is situated on the eastern bank of the Scioto River, and is 25 miles south of Columbus and 22 miles north of Chillicothe.

Calamus Swamp is a 19-acre public reserve located 1.5 miles (2.4 km) from the town.

Climate

Demographics

Median home prices in the Circleville area as of 2009 were $120,147.

2010 census
As of the census of 2010, there were 13,314 people, 5,402 households, and 3,447 families residing in the city. The racial makeup of the city was 95.4% White, 1.9% African American, 0.2% Native American, 0.4% Asian, 0.4% from other races, and 1.7% from two or more races. Hispanic or Latino people of any race were 1.1% of the population.

There were 5,402 households, of which 30.3% had children under the age of 18 living with them, 44.2% were married couples living together, 14.5% had a female householder with no husband present, 5.1% had a male householder with no wife present, and 36.2% were non-families. 30.5% of all households were made up of individuals, and 13.5% had someone living alone who was 65 years of age or older. The average household size was 2.36 and the average family size was 2.90.

The median age in the city was 39.3 years. 23.3% of residents were under the age of 18; 8.9% were between the ages of 18 and 24; 24.8% were from 25 to 44; 25.4% were from 45 to 64; and 17.7% were 65 years of age or older. The gender makeup of the city was 47.9% male and 52.1% female.

2000 census
As of the census of 2000, there were 13,485 people, 5,378 households, and 3,581 families residing in the city. The population density was 2,037.2 people per square mile (786.5/km2). There were 5,706 housing units at an average density of 862.0 per square mile (332.8/km2). The racial makeup of the city was 95.36% White, 2.54% African American, 0.20% Native American, 0.49% Asian, 0.06% Pacific Islander, 0.27% from other races, and 1.08% from two or more races. Hispanic or Latino people of any race were 0.82% of the population.

There were 5,378 households, out of which 31.1% had children under the age of 18 living with them, 49.8% were married couples living together, 12.7% had a female householder with no husband present, and 33.4% were non-families. 29.0% of all households were made up of individuals, and 13.4% had someone living alone who was 65 years of age or older. The average household size was 2.40 and the average family size was 2.93.

In the city the population was spread out, with 26.7% under the age of 18, 8.6% from 18 to 24, 26.7% from 25 to 44, 22.0% from 45 to 64, and 16.1% who were 65 years of age or older. The median age was 36 years. For every 100 females, there were 94.8 males. For every 100 females age 18 and over, there were 85.8 males.

The median income for a household in the city was $34,572, and the median income for a family was $41,943. Males had a median income of $32,342 versus $26,115 for females. The per capita income for the city was $17,220. About 11.1% of families and 13.3% of the population were below the poverty line, including 21.4% of those under age 18 and 6.5% of those age 65 or over.

Economy
Manufacturing makes up a significant proportion of area industry and employment; in the 2010 census, 3075 county residents (13.4%) were employed in manufacturing.
Circleville is home to the largest DuPont chemical plant in Ohio. Opened in the 1950s, it produces Mylar and Tedlar plastic films, the latter used extensively in the production of photovoltaic modules. PACCAR, a Seattle-based truck manufacturing company, has maintained a large factory for over 35 years.

Sofidel Group, one of the world's largest tissue paper manufacturers, invested $400 million in building a 1.4 million square foot plant on the south side of the city. Once it is operating at full capacity, the plant will employ approximately 700 people. The first roll of paper was produced from the plant in June 2018.

The PPG Industries Circleville plant is the company's center for polymer resin production, primarily for automotive applications. Fastenal Company distributes industrial, safety and construction supplies from its facility on US Highway 23 west of Circleville.

Global Transmission Parts, a world-class distributor of vehicle transmission parts, has its corporate headquarters and main warehouse located east of Circleville on State Route 56.

Other major employers include OhioHealth; Circleville City, Teays Valley Local and Logan Elm Local School districts; Circle Plastics/TriMold LLC; the State of Ohio; and Wal-Mart Stores.

Education
Circleville City School District operates one elementary school, one middle school, and Circleville High School.

Ohio Christian University, an institution affiliated with Churches of Christ in Christian Union, has been in operation at Circleville since 1948.

Circleville has a public library, a branch of the Pickaway County Library.

Arts and culture
Circleville hosts the Circleville Pumpkin Show every October.

Notable people

 Caleb Atwater – known as the "father of Ohio's public school system", the state's first historian, and an early scholar of the ancient Native American mounds and other earthworks in the Ohio Valley
 Conchata Ferrell – actress, best known for playing Berta the housekeeper in the CBS sitcom Two and a Half Men
 Tony Laubach – storm chaser and meteorologist featured on the Discovery Channel
 Ted Lewis – vaudeville performer and bandleader during the Roaring Twenties; a Ted Lewis Museum is located in the city, and a local park bears his name
 Ralph Haswell Lutz (1886–1968) – historian and chair of the board of directors of the Hoover War Library, 1925–1943
 Dwight Radcliff – longest serving sheriff in US history
 Kohl Sudduth – actor known for the Jesse Stone series of TV movies

References

Further reading

External links

 

 
1810 establishments in Ohio
Cities in Ohio
Cities in Pickaway County, Ohio
County seats in Ohio
Populated places established in 1810